Shams ul Haq (transliterations vary), an Arabic phrase meaning "Sun of the Truth", is a male Muslim given name. Notable bearers of the name include;

Muhammad Shams-ul-Haq Azimabadi (1857-1911), Indian scholar of Hadith
Shamsul Haque Faridpuri (1896–1969), Bengali Islamic scholar, educationist, and social reformer
Shamsul Huq (1918-1965), Bengali politician, first and third General Secretary of the Awami League
Shamsul Haq (1927-1998), Bangladesh Awami League politician and former Minister
Syed Shamsul Haque (1935–2016), Bangladeshi poet, lyricist and writer
Shamsul Hoque Tuku (born 1948), Bangladesh politician and former State Minister of Home Affairs
Mohammed Shamsul Hoque Bhuyan (born 1948), Bangladesh Awami League Member of Parliament
Shamsul Haque Chowdhury (born 1957), Bangladesh Awami League Member of Parliament
Shamsul Haque (general), Bangladesh General, QMG of Bangladesh Army
Shamsul Haque Talukder, Bangladesh Member of Parliament

Arabic masculine given names